This is a season-by-season list of records compiled by Rensselaer in men's ice hockey.

Rensselaer Polytechnic Institute has won two National Titles in its history.

Season-by-season results

Note: GP = Games played, W = Wins, L = Losses, T = Ties

* Winning percentage is used when conference schedules are unbalanced.† Rensselaer played jointly in ECAC Hockey and the Tri-State League/ICAC from 1961 to 1972.

Footnotes

References

 
Lists of college men's ice hockey seasons in the United States